Frenchtown Solar  is a group of three photvoltaic arrays, or solar farms, in Kingwood Township, about 3 miles east of  namesake Frenchtown,  Hunterdon County, New Jersey, United States.  Two arrays are located just outside the village of Baptistown on New Jersey Route 12 The third and largest is to the south, off County Route 519.

The power station was developed in conjunction with Con Ed Development. It interconnects to Jersey Central Power and Light, which in turn in is part of the PJM Interconnection. Flemington Solar is a similar project located in adjacent Raritan Township.

See also

Solar power in New Jersey
List of power stations in New Jersey

References 

Buildings and structures in Hunterdon County, New Jersey
Photovoltaic power stations in New Jersey
Energy infrastructure completed in 2013